Marcelo Pombo (born 1959) is an Argentine artist. His work is in the collections of the Museo Nacional de Bellas Artes, the Museo de Arte Moderno de Buenos Aires, the MALBA, Museo de Arte Latinoamericano de Buenos Aires,  the Museo Castagnino + macro, the Blanton Museum of Art of The University of Texas at Austin, among others.

Work 
In the late eighties, he began exhibiting small works with images connected to rock, psychedelia, and "gay culture". At the beginning of his career, he formed part of the group of artists that exhibited at the Galería de Artes Visuales at the Centro Cultural Rojas under the direction of Jorge Gumier Maier; the aesthetic production that came out of Rojas was crucial to the course of Argentine art in the nineties.

During that period, Pombo's work was characterized by the use of materials and procedures associated with decoration and domestic handicrafts of the sort taught in school.

Starting in 1999, his production revolved around paintings in synthetic enamel on panel that brought together different styles: surrealist or visionary landscape, costumbrismo, geometric art, and abstract expressionism.

From 2008 to 2015, his production centered on Argentine and Latin American art of the past—works produced at the margins of modernism or rendered invisible by art history.

Life

Early years 

He grew up in Buenos Aires, at the age of eight, he attended the "Taller de la Flor" directed by Ana Srezovic, where he drew and experimented with clay, batik, and enamel on metal.

His childhood was marked by an identification with the universe of rock -music, clothes, lifestyle-, influenced by the reading of Argentinian rock n' roll magazine Pelo and by listening Argentinian rock. He studied in San Isidro National High School.

In 1978, after graduating from high school, he began working as a gofer at an advertising agency. That same year, he enrolled in the Escuela Nacional de Bellas Artes Prilidiano Pueyrredón. He dropped out after only one month. He travelled to Tartagal, in the northern province of Salta, to coordinate a crafts workshop in a Wichí community and went on to visit the rest of northern Argentine, venturing as far north as the Bolivian border. When he returned to Buenos Aires, he worked as an apprentice at a print shop in San Telmo.

The Eighties 

In 1982, at the outbreak of the Falkland's War during the last military dictatorship, Marcelo Pombo traveled to São Paulo, Brazil. While there, he produced a series of drawings that make reference to the gay night life in that city. In their style, those drawings bear the influence of Walt Disney, low-budget films, and underground comics by artists ranging from Robert Crumb to Nazario.

He returned to Buenos Aires in 1983 and resumed his work at print shops. He soon began working as an art teacher at a special education school in Buenos Aires. In 1984, he got involved in the political group Grupo de Acción Gay (GAG), where he met cultural journalist, artist, and curator Jorge Gumier Maier and left-wing activist and university professor Carlos R. Luis—both of whom would prove decisive to his professional career and to his personal life.

Starting in 1985, he began making works in which he would drip synthetic enamel paint on existing objects like LPs and, in the case of the emblematic work "Winco", a record player, and collages with photographs from magazine. His first solo show was held at the Espacio Joven of the Centro Cultural Recoleta in 1987. In 1989, he showed at the Galería de Artes Visuales at the Centro Cultural Rojas for the first time, exhibiting works like Michael y yo. The first in a series of group shows featuring Pombo, Pablo Suárez, and Miguel Harte would take place at that same venue some months later.

The Nineties 

In 1991 and 1992, he made three works related to San Francisco Solano, the town outside of Buenos Aires where he worked as a special education teacher.

In their procedures and materials, those works make use of a complex network of references, combining the festive and the bitter.

In 1993, he traveled to New York City for the first time—in the company of Pablo Siquier—to participate in the exhibition “Space of Time” at the Americas Society. Other artists in the show included Félix González Torres, Larry Pittman, Rosângela Rennó, and Jana Sterbak. During these years, he produced works like Xuxa, Ramonesmanía and Telefe, which evidence a renewed interest in show business. Jorge López Anaya, an art historian and La Nación critic, stated the idea of a "light art" as synonymous of a futile, shallow and de-ideologized aesthetic linked to the artists from Rojas scene.

In 1995, Pombo made a series of drawings entitled Dibujos de Puerto Madryn, produced in the Patagonian city of that name in the province of Chubut.

In the late nineties, Pombo’s production veered toward works in synthetic enamel paint on panel that made use of a meticulous drop-on-drop technique to generate a hypnotic effect.

The 2000s 

During this decade, Pombo consolidated his career on the West Coast of the United States. He also won the prestigious Konex Award from Argentina in 2002. Pombo would gain critical attention in media like Flash Art, The New York Times, The Los Angeles Times, and Frieze. In 2006, he developed the show “Ocho pinturas y un objeto” where he exhibited works in enamel that depict floating scenes with small farmhouses, demonstrations, festivals, and rubble. Those works entail an eccentric mashup of French rococo, Latin American folklore, visionary painting, and other influences. That same year, the book Pombo with texts by Inés Katzenstein, Marcelo Pacheco, and Amalia Sato, was published by the publishing house Adriana Hidalgo.

2008-2021 

In 2008, he organized the show "Nuevos Artistas del Grupo Litoral" featuring artists from the Grupo Litoral active in Rosario in the fifties; other artists like Emilia Bertolé, Raquel Forner, and Domingo Candia; and his own work. The exhibition was held at the Museo Castagnino + macro in Rosario.

In 2009, he developed the project “Ornaments in the Landscape and the Museum as a Hotel Room” for the Blanton Museum of Art at the University of Texas, Austin. The project consisted of an installation recreating a reception room of a hotel as a featuring space for the exhibition of a series of meticulously crafted enamels. From 2010 to 2013, he developed two courses within the Artist Programme of the Torcuato Di Tella University in Buenos Aires: “Excursiones” y “Cómo construir un museo al costado de la ruta”. In 2011, he participated in the group show “Recovering Beauty: The 1990s in Buenos Aires”—the first retrospective exhibition of artists connected to the Galería de Artes Visuales at the Centro Cultural Rojas in the nineties. The show was held at the Blanton Museum of Art. In 2012, he launched the Museo Argentino de Arte Regional (MAAR), a virtual museum of images found on the internet, some of them subject to digital intervention. 

In 2013 the exhibition "Los duendes del campo decoraron el patrimonio durante la noche", also tied to his interest in Argentine art, was held at the Museo Arte Contemporáneo of the Universidad Nacional del Litoral in the province of Santa Fe. The retrospective show “Marcelo Pombo, un artista del pueblo” curated by Inés Katzenstein was held at the Colección de Arte Amalia Lacroze de Fortabat in Buenos Aires from May to August, 2015.

In 2017 he made the exhibition http://rosarioremix.castagninomacro.org/ at Macro (Museo de Arte Contemporáneo de Rosario), and in 2021 he created http://marcelopomboimagenesliberadas.com/ a website that offers a wide selection of his drawings made between 1982 and 2000, free under Creative Commons license.

The Ministry of Culture of Argentina awarded him the National Award for Artistic Career 2022, an award that recognizes the trajectory and contribution to Argentine art, and through which the awarded works become part of the collection of the National Museum of Fine Arts ( MNBA).

Sources

External links 
 http://marcelopomboimagenesliberadas.com/
Malba- Fundación Constantini 
Colección Amalia Lacroze de Fortabat 
 Macro- Castagnino, Rosario 
 Museo Nacional de Bellas Artes 
 Blanton Museum of Art -The University of Texas at Austin

1959 births
Living people
Argentine artists